Chien Wei-chuan (born 8 March 1971), also known as Rosa Chien, is a Taiwanese basketball coach and former player, widely considered the best female basketball player in Taiwanese history. She played on the Chinese Taipei women's national basketball team from 1988 to 2008, taking part in 10 FIBA Asia Championship for Women. She is currently the commissioner of the T1 League.

Chien became the youngest Taiwanese basketball player ever to make the national team at age 15. In the 1993 Summer Universiade, she set a record by scoring 84 points in a 117-35 blowout win against Hong Kong. In 1999, she tried out for the Orlando Miracle in the Women's National Basketball Association, but failed to make the cut. In 2002, she became the first Taiwanese player to play in the Women's Chinese Basketball Association (WCBA), where she played for 5 seasons. She finished her career in Taiwan's Women's Super Basketball League (WSBL). She was also the oldest player ever to represent Chinese Taipei when she played in the 2008 FIBA World Olympic Qualifying Tournament for Women, and at the age of 37, still averaged 20 points per game.

Chien has released a Mandopop album in 1996 and acted in the 2012 drama film Cha Cha for Twins. In 2012, she ran for a seat in New Taipei City at the Taiwanese legislative election, representing the Chinese Nationalist Party, but lost to Lin Shu-fen.

On August 6, 2022, she was announced as the commissioner of the T1 League.

Filmography

References

Taiwanese women's basketball players
Taiwanese basketball coaches
Asian Games medalists in basketball
Basketball players at the 1990 Asian Games
Basketball players at the 1994 Asian Games
Basketball players at the 1998 Asian Games
Basketball players at the 2002 Asian Games
Basketball players at the 2006 Asian Games
Asian Games bronze medalists for Chinese Taipei
Asian Games silver medalists for Chinese Taipei
Medalists at the 1990 Asian Games
Medalists at the 2002 Asian Games
Medalists at the 2006 Asian Games
1971 births
Living people
Beijing Great Wall players
Taiwanese expatriate basketball people in China
Chinese Taipei women's national basketball team players
Chinese Taipei women's national basketball team coaches